In mathematics, especially vector calculus and differential topology, a closed form is a differential form α whose exterior derivative is zero, and an exact form is a differential form, α, that is the exterior derivative of another differential form β.  Thus, an exact form is in the image of d, and a closed form is in the kernel of d.

For an exact form α,  for some differential form β of degree one less than that of α. The form β is called a "potential form" or "primitive" for α. Since the exterior derivative of a closed form is zero, β is not unique, but can be modified by the addition of any closed form of degree one less than that of α.

Because , every exact form is necessarily closed. The question of whether every closed form is exact depends on the topology of the domain of interest.  On a contractible domain, every closed form is exact by the Poincaré lemma. More general questions of this kind on an arbitrary differentiable manifold are the subject of de Rham cohomology, which allows one to obtain purely topological information using differential methods.

Examples 

A simple example of a form that is closed but not exact is the 1-form  given by the derivative of argument on the punctured plane  Since  is not actually a function (see the next paragraph)  is not an exact form. Still,  has vanishing derivative and is therefore closed.

Note that the argument  is only defined up to an integer multiple of  since a single point  can be assigned different arguments   etc. We can assign arguments in a locally consistent manner around  but not in a globally consistent manner. This is because if we trace a loop from  counterclockwise around the origin and back to  the argument increases by  Generally, the argument  changes by

over a counter-clockwise oriented loop 

Since the derivative at  only uses local data, and since functions that differ by a constant have the same derivative, the argument has a globally well-defined derivative 

The upshot is that  is a one-form on  that is not actually the derivative of any well-defined function  We say that  is not exact. Explicitly,  is given as:

which by inspection has derivative zero. Because  has vanishing derivative, we say that it is closed.

This form generates the de Rham cohomology group  meaning that any closed form  is the sum of an exact form  and a multiple of   where  accounts for a non-trivial contour integral around the origin, which is the only obstruction to a closed form on the punctured plane (locally the derivative of a potential function) being the derivative of a globally defined function.

Examples in low dimensions 

Differential forms in R2 and R3 were well known in the mathematical physics of the nineteenth century. In the plane, 0-forms are just functions, and 2-forms are functions times the basic area element , so that it is the 1-forms

that are of real interest. The formula for the exterior derivative d here is

where the subscripts denote partial derivatives.

In this case if  is a function then

The implication from 'exact' to 'closed' is then a consequence of the symmetry of second derivatives, with respect to x and y.

The gradient theorem asserts that a 1-form is exact if and only if the line integral of the form depends only on the endpoints of the curve, or equivalently,
if the integral around any smooth closed curve is zero.

Vector field analogies 
On a Riemannian manifold, or more generally a pseudo-Riemannian manifold, k-forms correspond to k-vector fields (by  duality via the metric), so there is a notion of a vector field corresponding to a closed or exact form.

In 3 dimensions, an exact vector field (thought of as a 1-form) is called a conservative vector field, meaning that it is the derivative (gradient) of a 0-form (smooth scalar field), called the scalar potential. A closed vector field (thought of as a 1-form) is one whose derivative (curl) vanishes, and is called an irrotational vector field.

Thinking of a vector field as a 2-form instead, a closed vector field is one whose derivative (divergence) vanishes, and is called an incompressible flow (sometimes solenoidal vector field). The term incompressible is used because a non-zero divergence corresponds to the presence of sources and sinks in analogy with a fluid.

The concepts of conservative and incompressible vector fields generalize to n dimensions, because gradient and divergence generalize to n dimensions; curl is defined only in three dimensions, thus the concept of irrotational vector field does not generalize in this way.

Poincaré lemma 

More generally, the lemma states that on a contractible open subset of a manifold (e.g.), a closed p-form, p > 0, is exact.

Formulation as cohomology 

When the difference of two closed forms is an exact form, they are said to be cohomologous to each other.  That is, if ζ and η are closed forms, and one can find some β such that

then one says that ζ and η are cohomologous to each other. Exact forms are sometimes said to be cohomologous to zero. The set of all forms cohomologous to a given form (and thus to each other) is called a de Rham cohomology class; the general study of such classes is known as cohomology. It makes no real sense to ask whether a 0-form (smooth function) is exact, since d increases degree by 1; but the clues from topology suggest that only the zero function should be called "exact". The cohomology classes are identified with locally constant functions.

Using contracting homotopies similar to the one used in the proof of the Poincaré lemma, it can be shown that de Rham cohomology is homotopy-invariant.

Application in electrodynamics 

In electrodynamics, the case of the magnetic field  produced by a stationary electrical current is important. There one deals with the vector potential  of this field. The current-density vector is  It corresponds to the current two-form

For the magnetic field   one has analogous results: it corresponds to the induction two-form  and can be derived from the vector potential , or the corresponding one-form ,

Thereby the vector potential  corresponds to the potential one-form

The closedness of the magnetic-induction two-form corresponds to the property of the magnetic field that it is source-free:  i.e., that there are no magnetic monopoles.

In a special gauge, this implies 

(Here  is the magnetic constant.)

This equation is remarkable, because it corresponds completely to a well-known formula for the electrical field , namely for the electrostatic Coulomb potential  of a charge density . At this place one can already guess that
  and 
  and 
  and 
can be unified to quantities with six rsp. four nontrivial components, which is the basis of the relativistic invariance of the Maxwell equations.

Finally, as before, one integrates over the three primed space coordinates. (As usual c is the vacuum velocity of light.)

Notes

Citations

References 
 .
 
 
 

Differential forms
Lemmas in analysis